"That's It" is a song by American rappers Future and Lil Uzi Vert from their collaborative studio album Pluto × Baby Pluto (2020). It was produced by Wheezy and Nils.

Critical reception
Fred Thomas of AllMusic described "That's It" as a track from Pluto × Baby Pluto that is "slinking" and "especially fun, with Future and Lil Uzi Vert sounding like they can't wait to take their turn on the mic to top the other's lyrical punch lines or unexpectedly rerouted flows".

Music video
The official music video was released alongside the song and album. Directed by Hype Williams, it sees Future and Lil Uzi Vert rapping on a soccer field as a women's team practices behind them, occasionally joining in with them, and also in a rainforest setting.

Charts

References

2020 songs
Future (rapper) songs
Lil Uzi Vert songs
Songs written by Future (rapper)
Songs written by Lil Uzi Vert
Songs written by Wheezy (record producer)
Song recordings produced by Wheezy (record producer)
Music videos directed by Hype Williams